Viacheslav Valerievich Datsik (born 13 February 1980), also known as Red Tarzan and Red-Haired Tarzan, is a Russian white supremacist, convicted felon, professional boxer and former professional kickboxer and mixed martial artist.

Datsik fought professionally in his native Russia between 1999 and 2006, retiring with an 6–9 record. Since retiring from competition, he has gained notoriety both for his criminal behavior and vigilante raids on brothels, as well as his white supremacist and neo-Nazi beliefs.

Martial arts career
Datsik attained some degree of fame in the mixed martial arts community, due mostly to his dramatic knock-out of future Ultimate Fighting Championship heavyweight champion Andrei Arlovski at the MFC World Championship on 9 April 1999, and, in part, to his wild fighting style and notorious in-ring antics. Another notable fight was in a Pankration bout in 2001, when Datsik faced Vitali Shkraba. During the fight he poked Shkraba in the eye, which resulted in a disqualification.

Imprisonment
After losing six straight fights between December 2001 and February 2003, Datsik pursued a career in kickboxing and appeared in his final MMA bout on 23 August 2006.  He later seemingly disappeared completely, leading to widespread rumors that he had died in a train wreck. These rumors, however, were set to rest, when it was reported in March 2007 he was alive and well, after being detained for his part in the armed robbery of various mobile phone shops in St. Petersburg.

Datsik was a follower of the Slavic Union white supremacist organization. He reportedly had obsessive antisemitic and anti-Christian views, while exalting Slavic paganism. The official expert analysis on his mental sanity asserted that he claimed Jesus Christ was a Mossad agent, whereas Datsik believing himself to be “Red Tarzan,” the son of Slavic god Perun. In the analysis he was concluded to have schizophrenia and avoided criminal charges. He was first locked in a high-security mental institution for therapy but he was transferred to a low-security psychiatric clinic in July 2010.

Escape and deportation
In August 2010 he escaped, by tearing a hole in the wire fence around the low security clinic, apparently using his bare hands. He then illegally crossed the border to Norway in a boat and met with Norwegian reporters. While wearing Nazi symbols, he told the reporters that he was "not a nationalist, but a racist". Joined by two neo-Nazis from "an ex-Soviet Baltic state" living in Norway, he appeared at the International Police Immigration Service in Oslo on 21 September 2010, where he handed in a loaded weapon, declared himself a "white warrior" and requested political asylum. As a result, the police searched their tattoo shop where they found five illegal handguns and an entrance card stolen from the Norwegian Armed Forces. Nazi paraphernalia including a large doll dressed up as a Nazi was found near the front entrance of the shop. The newspaper interviewed residents near the tattoo shop who claimed they 'often heard loud noise, screaming and banging'. The neighbors also stated they would occasionally see the occupants of the tattoo shop 'practicing fighting and boxing while completely naked'. All three were then jailed, while the case is being investigated. On 18 October Russian authorities sent an extradition request to Norwegian authorities.

In the week of 29 October, a Norwegian police physician submitted a report based on conversations with Datsik and review of available documents which concluded that he did not have a serious mental disease. Datsik's lawyers are of the opinion that Russian authorities made up the psychiatric diagnosis and that Norwegian authorities on that ground must allow Datsik to remain in Norway. Datsik also claims that he was tortured by Russian authorities. The torture included the application of electrodes to his genitals and placing him in an iron cage for eight months, naked and handcuffed. He has twice attempted suicide in Norwegian detainment due to being isolated from the other prisoners, but he was again isolated after shouting racist remarks from his cell window. Datsik had been placed in solitary confinement for four weeks despite the court's order being limited to one week. Norwegian police blamed capacity issues for this. The Norwegian newspaper Dagbladet writes that Datsik has allegedly told the police that he wants his girlfriend to come to Norway for family reunification.

He has since asked the court to give him the maximum sentence, as he has said that it would help him live a healthier life, while announcing that he is "too raw for humanity". He has told the Norwegian media that he wants to compete in mixed martial arts under the flag of Norway. Russia has sought the extradition of Datsik. On 22 December 2010, a demonstration was held by his followers in Oslo. Viacheslav Datsik was deported from Norway on 18 March 2011. In December 2011, rumours surfaced from Russia, that Datsik had been killed in a prison fight. However Alexander Zubov, Head of Press Service of the Federal Penitentiary Service management for the St. Petersburg and Leningrad region, dismissed the reports, claiming that Datsik is well and healthy.

Release
Datsik was released from custody in 2016. Datsik had been imprisoned for 9 years, apart from a one-month stint of freedom, following his escape.

Politics
Datsik was at one time involved in political activities, as a member of a now-banned nationalist Russian party, Slavic Union. He was relatively successful in contributing to the popularity of the party, as his name and image helped him to attract supporters. After Datsik's arrest in Norway, Dmitry Dyomushkin, the leader of the banned party, made statements to distance his group from Datsik's activities.

Personal life
Datsik is father to two children from a former relationship with Xenia Efimova.

Mixed martial arts record

|-
| Win
| align=center| 6–9
| Andrey Kirsanov
| Submission (armbar)
| Fight Night 2
| 
| align=center| 2
| align=center| N/A
| Belorechensk, Krasnodar Krai
| 
|-
| Win
| align=center| 5–9
| Stanislav Nuschik
| Submission (heel hook)
| Ultimate Combat Russia (−90 kg)
| 
| align=center| 1
| align=center| 0:44
| Moscow, Russia
| 
|-
| Loss
| align=center| 4–9
| Sergei Gur
| TKO (doctor stoppage)
| BARS: Cup of Arbat Quarter-finals (+94 kg)
| 
| align=center| 2
| align=center| N/A
| Moscow, Russia
| 
|-
| Loss
| align=center| 4–8
| Zurab Akhmedov
| Decision (unanimous)
| BARS: Cup of Arbat Final (−71 kg)
| 
| align=center| 3
| align=center| 5:00
| Moscow, Russia
| 
|-
| Loss
| align=center| 4–7
| Eduard Voznovich
| Decision (unanimous)
| BARS
| 
| align=center| 3
| align=center| 5:00
| Moscow, Russia
| 
|-
| Loss
| align=center| 4–6
| Roman Sukoterin
| Decision (unanimous)
| BARS
| 
| align=center| 3
| align=center| 5:00
| Moscow, Russia
| 
|-
| Loss
| align=center| 4–5
| Andrey Kindrich
| Decision (unanimous)
| BARS
| 
| align=center| 3
| align=center| 5:00
| Moscow, Russia
| 
|-
| Loss
| align=center| 4–4
| Romazi Korkelia
| TKO (punches)
| Pankration Eurasian Championship 2001
| 
| align=center| 1
| align=center| N/A
| Moscow, Russia
| 
|-
| Win
| align=center| 4–3
| Eldanis Safarov
| KO (punch)
| BARS
| 
| align=center| 1
| align=center| N/A
| Moscow, Russia
| 
|-
| Win
| align=center| 3–3
| Patrick de Witte
| Submission (rear-naked choke)
| M-1 MFC – Russia vs. the World 1
| 
| align=center| 1
| align=center| 0:30
| Moscow, Russia
| 
|-
| Loss
| align=center| 2–3
| Vitali Shkraba
| DQ (eye gouging)
| Pankration Russian Championship 2001
| 
| align=center| 1
| align=center| 3:05
| Moscow, Russia
| 
|-
| Win
| align=center| 2–2
| Andrey Budnik
| TKO (punch)
| Pankration World Championship 2000
| 
| align=center| 1
| align=center| 2:13
| Moscow, Russia
| 
|-
| Loss
| align=center| 1–2
| Ramazan Mezhidov
| KO (punch)
| Pankration Russian Championship 2000
| 
| align=center| N/A
| align=center| N/A
| Moscow, Russia
| 
|-
| Loss
| align=center| 1–1
| Martin Malkhasyan
| Submission (rear-naked choke)
| M-1 MFC – World Championship 1999
| 
| align=center| 1
| align=center| 0:57
| Moscow, Russia
| 
|-
| Win
| align=center| 1–0
| Andrei Arlovski
| KO (punch)
| M-1 MFC – World Championship 1999
| 
| align=center| 1
| align=center| 6:07
| Saint Petersburg, Russia
| 

Record confirmed through Sherdog.com and FightLife.ru

Professional boxing record

Kickboxing record 

|-
|Loss
|align=center|6–2
| Le BonnerJerome Le Banner
| KO
| Fight World Cup TNA Fights
|
|align=center| 2
|
|Kazan, Russia
|
|-
|Win
|align=center|6–1
| PodolyachinDenis Podolyachin
|UD
| Fight Club Arbat
|
|align=center|6
|
|Moscow, Russia
|
|-
|Win
|align=center|5–1
| Zdragush Oleg Zdragush
| KO
| WBKF
|
|align=center| 3
|
|Moscow, Russia
|
|-
|Win
|align=center|4–1
| Shvelidze David Shvelidze
|UD
| Fight Club Arbat
|
|align=center| 3
|
|Moscow, Russia
|
|-
|Loss
|align=center|3–1
| Zuravkov Andrey Zuravkov
| DQ
| Fight Club Arbat
|
|align=center| 3
|
|Moscow, Russia
|
|-
|Win
|align=center|3–0
| Orlov Evgeniy Orlov
| KO
| Fight Club Arbat
|
|align=center| 1
|
|Moscow, Russia
|
|-
|Win
|align=center|2–0
| Buj Vyacheslav Buj
| TKO
| Fight Club Arbat
|
|align=center| 3
|
|Moscow, Russia
|
|-
|Win
|align=center|1–0
| Vorobiev Dmitri Vorobiev
| KO
| Fight Club Arbat
|
|align=center| 2
|
|Moscow, Russia
|
|-

Record confirmed through FightLife.ru

References

External links

1977 births
Living people
Russian male kickboxers
Heavyweight kickboxers
Russian male mixed martial artists
Heavyweight mixed martial artists
Russian Muay Thai practitioners
Mixed martial artists utilizing Muay Thai
Mixed martial artists utilizing pankration
Russian male boxers 
Sportspeople from Saint Petersburg
Russian neo-Nazis
Russian modern pagans
Russian prisoners and detainees
Prisoners and detainees of Russia
Prisoners and detainees of Norway
People with schizophrenia
People deported from Norway
Russian people of Belarusian descent
Russian nationalists
People convicted of robbery
Russian criminals
Vigilantes